Shadow of a Doubt is a 1993 French drama film written and directed by Aline Issermann. 

The film was entered into the main competition at the 50th Venice International Film Festival.

Cast 

 Mireille Perrier: Mother
 Alain Bashung: Father
 Sandrine Blancke: Alexandrine
 Emmanuelle Riva: Grandmother
 Michel Aumont: Grandfather
 Josiane Balasko: Sophia
 Luis Issermann: Pierre
 Roland Bertin: Juge
 Dominique Lavanant: Teacher
 Thierry Lhermitte: Alexandrine's Lawyer
 Jean-Pierre Sentier: Lawyer Toussaint
 Féodor Atkine: Thérapeute
 Isabelle Petit-Jacques: Thérapeute
 Cynthia Gavas: Inspector
 Eric Franklin:  Inspector
 Simon de La Brosse:  Inspector

References

External links

 
1993 films
French drama films 
1993 drama films
1990s French films